Levin Domain, also known as Courtesy Domain, is a cricket and rugby union ground in Levin, Manawatū-Whanganui, New Zealand.  The first recorded cricket match held on the ground came in 1966 when Horowhenua played Southern Hawke's Bay in the 1965/66 Hawke Cup.

List A cricket was first played there in 1985 when Central Districts played Auckland in the 1984/85 Shell Cup.  The ground held seven further List A matches, the last of which came during the 1995/96 season when Central Districts played Northern Districts.  Three first-class matches have been played there, with Central Districts playing Canterbury in the 1985/86 Shell Trophy and Wellington in the 1986/87 and 1987/88 Shell Trophy's.  Two Women's One Day Internationals have held there.  The first saw New Zealand Women play Australia Women in 1994, while the second saw Australia Women play India Women in the 1994–95 New Zealand Women's Centenary Tournament.

In rugby union the Levin Domain is the home of the Horowhenua-Kapiti Rugby Football Union, whose representative team plays at the ground. They compete in the Heartland Championship.

References

External links
Levin Domain at ESPNcricinfo
Levin Domain at CricketArchive

Cricket grounds in New Zealand
Rugby union stadiums in New Zealand
Sports venues in Manawatū-Whanganui
Levin, New Zealand